Natasha Stagg is a writer based in New York City.

Early life and education 
Stagg grew up in Tucson, Arizona. She attended the University of Michigan in Ann Arbor, where her writing won a Hopwood Award for nonfiction and the Roy W. Cowden Memorial Fellowship.  She moved to New York City and has since attended a residency at Yaddo.

Work 
Stagg published her first book, Surveys, in 2016 through Semiotext(e)/Native Agents. The coming of age novel follows 23-year-old Colleen, a mall employee in Tucson, Arizona, who rises to internet fame by blogging about her semi-famous boyfriend and recent move to sunny Los Angeles, CA. The protagonist's obsession for a never-ending stream of external validation from online followers as well as the constant grooming of her public relationship with her boyfriend has led many critics to describe the novel as a prescient first-hand account of the rise of the phenomena of social media influencers on Instagram and Twitter.

In 2019, Stagg's second book, titled Sleeveless: Fashion, Image, Media, New York 2011–2019, was published and included a number of essays, criticism, and auto-fiction on publishing, art, and fashion from the 2010s. The book features essays on The Real Housewives of New York, Abercrombie & Fitch and Marc Jacobs, Alexandra Marzella, Kim Kardashian, Russian-red boots, PR jobs, and fundraising parties.

In 2020, Stagg wrote about Eduardo "Roth" Neira's eco-friendly architecture firm, Roth Architecture, and its newest project, the SFER IK Museion in Mexico.

Stagg has written for Artforum, V, Playboy, Spike Art Magazine, and n+1.

References

Living people
Year of birth missing (living people)
Writers from New York City
Writers from Tucson, Arizona
21st-century American women writers
21st-century American writers